The 27th Venice Biennale, held in 1954, was an exhibition of international contemporary art, with 31 participating nations. The Venice Biennale takes place biennially in Venice, Italy. Winners of the Gran Premi (Grand Prize) included German painter Max Ernst, French sculptor Jean Arp, Spanish etcher Joan Miró, and Italians painter Giuseppe Santomaso, sculptor Pericle Fazzini, and etcher Paolo Manaresi ex aequo with Cesco Magnolato.

References

Bibliography

Further reading 

 
 
 
 
 
 
 
 
 
 
 
 
 
 
 

1954 in art
1954 in Italy
Venice Biennale exhibitions